William Henry Miles (1828–1892) was a founder and the first senior bishop of the Colored Methodist Episcopal Church in America, a Methodist denomination formed in 1870 to serve African-American Methodists in the American South. Miles College in Birmingham, Alabama is named in his honor.

Life
Miles was born in Springfield, Kentucky.  He was a slave of Mrs. Mary Miles; when she died in 1854, she willed William his freedom (although he was not freed until 1864).

Images

References

Christian Methodist Episcopal Church
People from Springfield, Kentucky
1828 births
1892 deaths